Cuckoo Land is a short (6 episodes, ½ hour each) TV drama/adventure series from New Zealand, produced in 1986.

The series was screened on Britain's CBBC in 1991.

Cast 
Grant Tilly as Branchy
Paul Holmes as narrator (voice only)
Eleanor Gibson as Polly
Kendyl Robson as Patch

Episodes

References

External links 
 

1986 New Zealand television series debuts
1986 New Zealand television series endings
New Zealand children's television series
1980s New Zealand television series
TVNZ 2 original programming